Hilde von Stolz (8 July 1903 in Segesvár, Nagy-Küküllő County, Austria-Hungary, now Romania – 16 December 1973 in Berlin) was an Austrian-German actress.

Von Stolz attended the Max Reinhardt Seminar in Vienna and made her debut at the local Kammerspielen. She subsequently performed at various theaters in Vienna and in the Theater am Schiffbauerdamm in Berlin.

She made her debut in film in 1928 under the pseudonym "Helen Steels".  That same year, she moved to Berlin. In her second film role, she played the lead role opposite Reinhold Schünzel in  Don Juan in a Girls' School. Von Stolz began performing under her real name starting in 1933.  She established herself as a major film actress although she had to be satisfied with major supporting roles that usually portrayed elegant ladies and femmes fatales such as the actress Lydia Link in The Dreamer.

Von Stolz had planned to emigrate from Germany but the outbreak of the Second World War in 1939 frustrated those plans. During the war she worked in a number of Nazi propaganda films, the most widely known of these was her role as the wife of Duke Karl Alexander in Veit Harlan's Jud Süß (1940).  After the war, she acted only rarely in films.

After her death in 1973, she was buried in the family vault.

Filmography 

 1928: Der Schulmeister vom Lichtenthal
 1928:  Don Juan in a Girls' School as Trude
 1928: The Three Women of Urban Hell as Anuschka
 1928: Hell in Frauensee
 1929: Menschen im Feuer
 1929: Heilige oder Dirne as Therese
 1930: What Price Love?
 1930: Troika  as Natascha
 1931: A Storm Over Zakopane as the paralytic young woman
 1931: The Soaring Maiden as Else Brandt
 1932: Der kleine Pit (Short film)
 1933: Life Begins Tomorrow as Marie
 1933: Mit Dir durch dick und dünn
 1934: My Heart Calls You as Vera Valetti
 1934: Maskerade as Gerda Harrandt 
 1934: Achtung! Wer kennt diese Frau?
 1934: The Gentleman Without a Residence as Mrs. Mangold
 1935: Asew as Nelly
 1935: ... Just a comedian as Countess Karola von Röderau
 1935: Es flüstert die Liebe
 1935: The Love of the Maharaja as Daisy Atkins
 1936: The Dreamer as Lydia Link
 1936: Stronger Than Regulations as Mrs. Lörik
 1936: Der Abenteurer von Paris
 1936: Girls in White as Natalia the dancer
 1936: Der Weg des Herzens / Prater
 1936: Sein letztes Modell
 1937: The Glass Ball as Nina Sylten
 1937: When Women Keep Silent as Mira Mirella
 1937: To New Shores as Fanny Hoyer
 1938: Frühlingsluft
 1938: Scheidungsreise
 1938: Kleiner Mann – ganz groß
 1939: Ins blaue Leben
 1939: Castles in the Air  as the singer
 1939: The Fire Devil
 1940: Herz geht vor Anker
 1940: Jud Süß as Duke Karl Alexander's wife
 1940: Der Weg ins Freie
 1941: The Great King
 1941: Tanz mit dem Kaiser
 1942: Front Theatre
 1942: With the Eyes of a Woman as Cora Solani
 1942: Diesel as Mrs. von Lorrenz
 1943: Münchhausen as Louise La Tour
 1943: 
 1943: Die schwache Stunde
 1944: Glück unterwegs
 1945: Ich glaube an Dich
 1945: Freunde
 1947: Marriage in the Shadows as Greta Koch
 1954: Love is Forever
 1954: The Great Test as Mrs. Ermer
 1956: Charley's Aunt as the Consul general's wife
 1956: The Trapp Family as Baroness Mathilde
 1956: Die Christel von der Post as Anni Klewinski
 1958: Es war die erste Liebe

References 

1903 births
1973 deaths
People from Sighișoara
Austrian film actresses
Austrian silent film actresses
Austrian stage actresses
Germany articles needing attention
20th-century Austrian actresses